Lozova or Lozovaya is a city in Kharkiv Oblast (province) of eastern Ukraine. It serves as the administrative center of the Lozova Raion (district). Lozova hosts the administration of Lozova urban hromada, one of the hromadas of Ukraine.  Population: 

Lozova is the 2nd largest city in Kharkiv Oblast after Kharkiv in terms of population.

History 
Lozova was founded in the late 1860s as a settlement in Kharkov Governorate of the Russian Empire.

During the Russian Civil War, it was occupied by German troops from April 1918 until November 1918.

A local newspaper has been published in Lozova since August 1929.

During World War II, it was under German occupation from 11 October 1941 to 16 September 1943.

After its liberation, the city was completely restored. In 1953, there were four high schools, two libraries, one House of Culture, and one stadium.

In 1972, the population was 38,800 people.

In January 1989, the population was 72,991 people.

The city was evacuated on 27 August 2008 due to a fire in an arsenal. However, there were no serious casualties or deaths.

In January 2013, the population was 58,307 people.

Until 18 July 2020, Lozova was incorporated as a city of oblast significance and the center of the Lozova Municipality. The municipality was abolished in July 2020 as part of the administrative reform of Ukraine, which reduced the number of raions of Kharkiv Oblast to seven. The area of Lozova Municipality was merged into Lozova Raion.

2022 Russian invasion of Ukraine
Russia started an invasion of Ukraine on 24 February 2022. Lozova has come under attack several times since the beginning of Russian invasion of Ukraine as it is one of the main railway hubs and a city of strategic significance. 

 On 24 February 2022 at 5:52 am, a radar station located in the south of the city near Avilovka raion was hit by three Russian missiles which saw the devastation of the radar station and a gas transit station nearby.

 On 20 May 2022, a Russian missile system fired three rockets, according to Ukrainian sources; two of them were anticipated by the Ukrainian anti-rocket system but the third one hit the city's Cultural Centre. According to the ministry of emergency affairs of Ukraine, 11 people were injured but no one died (however, an 11-year old girl was among those severely injured). Russian authorities made no comment but on some unofficial Twitter handles of pro-Russian forces, it was claimed that the Ukrainian Territorial Defence Brigade was hiding in the Cultural House building.

Climate

Transport 

Lozova is a main rail hub within the Kharkiv Oblast.

People from Lozova 
 Leonid Skirko, Canadian bass-baritone opera singer of Ukrainian origin
 Anatol Rapoport, Jewish American mathematical psychologist
 Oleksandr Hladkyi, Ukrainian football player
 Vitaliy Zotov, Ukrainian basketball player

References

External links 
 
 InfoPort — Information-entertaining portal of Lozova

 
Cities in Kharkiv Oblast
Cities of regional significance in Ukraine